Pity is a sympathetic sorrow evoked by the suffering of others.

Pity may also refer to:

 Pity (film), 2018
 Pity (William Blake), a  1795 painting
 "Pity", a song by Arca from Sheep
 Pity Martínez, an Argentine football player
 Cristian Álvarez (musician), an Argentine musician

See also